Roedean School is an independent boarding and day school founded in 1885 in Roedean Village on the outskirts of Brighton, East Sussex, England, and governed by Royal Charter. It is for girls aged 11 to 18. The campus is situated near the Sussex Downs, on a cliff overlooking Brighton Marina and the English Channel.

The school incorporates dance studios, music classrooms, a 320-seat theatre, a heated indoor swimming pool, a golf course, a private tunnel to the beach, a farm and a chapel, as well as a range of workshops, studios, laboratories and sports pitches. It is also well-provisioned with a variety of classrooms.

Roedean School is a member of the Girls' Schools Association and the Headmasters' and Headmistresses' Conference (HMC). The Good Schools Guide stated that the "School has a healthy spirit and much to offer." The Independent Schools Inspectorate rated Roedean as Excellent in all areas (highest category) in its most recent  inspection (March 2016).

History
The school was founded in 1885 as Wimbledon House by three: Penelope and her step-sisters Millicent, and Dorothy Lawrence. Their brother was the lawyer Sir Paul Lawrence of Wimbledon who became unable to support them. Their Lawrence great aunts had been noted school teachers earlier in the century, mainly in Liverpool. Roedean was founded to prepare girls for entrance to the newly opened women's colleges at Cambridge University, Girton (now co-ed) and Newnham Colleges where Penelope had studied. In 1898, the school moved to its present site, occupying new buildings designed by the architect Sir John Simpson. A sister school, also called Roedean School and co-founded by the youngest Lawrence sister, Theresa, in 1903, is located in Johannesburg, South Africa.

The school motto, Honneur aulx dignes, is in Norman French, and means "Honour the worthy". When pronounced, it sounds like "Honour Roedean".

In 1924 the Lawrence sisters were replaced by Emmeline Mary Tanner who became the new head. She had been poached from Bedford High School by Penelope Lawrence as their successor.

During the Second World War, the students and staff were temporarily evacuated to Keswick, in the north of England. The school buildings in Brighton, Sussex were used by the Admiralty. They adapted it for use by Navy cadets attending the Mining and Torpedo School (known as HMS Vernon). Roedean is one of the few girls' schools in the country to have an Old Boys' Association.

The artist Percy Shakespeare was killed by a German bomb while serving at Roedean.

Absorption of St Mary's Hall
Inspired by his friend William Carus-Wilson, who founded Cowan Bridge School, Reverend Henry Venn Elliott proposed to found a similar school for the county. St Mary's Hall was opened in 1836 and was the second-oldest girls' school in the United Kingdom before it was closed in 2009. At that time, its junior section became Roedean's junior school while many senior girls transferred to Roedean. The junior school was closed in 2011 as the school administration decided to focus on secondary and sixth form education.

Location

Academic results
In 2022, the school achieved their best ever results, with 71% of all A-Level grades A*-A and 85% of GCSE grades 9-7.

Houses
The school community is divided into houses.

The Lawrence and Tanner House (with Senior and Junior wings) system, introduced in 2005, was reversed starting in 2010. A numbered house system was reintroduced. Roedean school has the longest corridor in England.

Year 7 to Year 11 students are spread out amongst Houses 1, 2, 3, and 4. These are named after the house numbers 1–4 of Lewes Crescent, where the School was located prior to moving in 1898 to this campus built for it.

Sixth form (Years 12–13) are admitted to Keswick House and Lawrence House, which are detached from the main school building.

In the 1960s, the houses were:
Junior House;
House Number 1;
House Number 2;
House Number 3;
House Number 4;
and a Sanatorium. In 1966 part of the Sanatorium was made into rooms for 6th form girls, two 6th form girls from every numbered house. The School retains a sanatorium wing (now known as a health centre) to this day.

Admission procedures
Roedean is a selective school, and entry to the school is based upon the School's own entrance examinations, interviews and reports from the students' previous schools.

Notable alumni
Past pupils are known as Old Roedeanians and include:

Arts
Vera Stanley Alder, painter
Pauline Boumphrey, sculptor
Enid Marx, designer
Beatrix Ong MBE, fashion accessories designer
Phyllis Pearsall MBE, artist, writer and publisher
Clare Pooley, blogger and novelist
Zina Saro-Wiwa, video artist and filmmaker
Jillian Becker, author
Dorothy Theomin, philanthropist and art collector

Healthcare and education
Dame Cicely Saunders, nurse, social worker, physician and writer
Olive Willis, founder of Downe House School

Journalism and literature
Alison Adburgham, fashion editor of The Guardian, author and social historian
Jani Allan, journalist, broadcaster
Tessa Dahl, novelist and daughter of Roald Dahl
Adèle Geras, writer
Zerbanoo Gifford, writer and human rights campaigner
Naseem Khan (activist), journalist and activist
Noo Saro-Wiwa, author
Nancy Spain, journalist, author and broadcaster
Katharine Whitehorn, journalist, writer, and columnist

Military and sport
Barbara Calder (1924-2018), yachtswoman
Elizabeth Devereux-Rochester, member of SOE F Section
Tanya Streeter, world champion freediver
Philippa Tattersall, soldier and first female to complete the All Arms Commando Course

Politics and activism
Ursula Graham Bower, anthropologist and guerrilla fighter in Burma during World War II
Jill Braithwaite, Lady Braithwaite, anthropologist, diplomat and social reformer
Anna Campbell, activist
Lynda Chalker, Baroness Chalker, politician
Dame Margaret Cole, politician and writer
Flick Drummond, Conservative Party politician
Helen Millar Craggs, suffragette
Birgit Cunningham, campaigner
Layla Moran, Liberal Democrat politician

Science
Helen Dick Megaw, crystallographer

Theatre, television, and film
Jill Balcon, actress
Hermione Cockburn, broadcaster
Noel Dyson, actress
Lucy Griffiths, actress
Rebecca Hall, actress
Jessica Hester Hsuan, actress
Verity Lambert OBE, television producer
Sarah Miles, actress
Rhona Mitra, actress, model and singer-songwriter
Honeysuckle Weeks, actress
Perdita Weeks, actress
Jessica Claire, actress

Roedeanians in fiction

 Sophie (bohemian and perpetually dissatisfied single mother in David Kane's film This Year's Love, 1993)
 Chummy Browne (Camilla Fortescue-Cholmondeley-Browne) in Call the Midwife
 Lady Penelope Creighton-Ward (heroine in the marionette series Thunderbirds)
 Dawn Drummond-Clayton (Tarzan's great-granddaughter in the Bunduki series)
 Emily James (Head of PR, Hotel Babylon)
 Lucy Saxon, a character in the science fiction series Doctor Who. Both Emily James and Lucy Saxon are portrayed by Alexandra Moen.
 Scarlett Papava in the James Bond novel Devil May Care
 Lady Constance, as well as Monica Simmons and her five sisters, in the Blandings series.
 Cecilia Tallis in the novel Atonement
 Lady Mary Wimsey in Dorothy L. Sayers' Lord Peter Wimsey novels
 Evelyn Caldessa in Mike Carey's Felix Castor novels
 Phyllida Erskine-Brown (née Trant) in the Rumpole of the Bailey series
 Saffron Courtney (daughter of Leon Courtney) in Wilbur Smith's novel "War Cry" attends Roedean in South Africa and England
 Emma Holmes in Elly Griffiths' Magic Men mystery novels
 Charlotte Lacon, daughter of Oliver Lacon in John Le Carré's novel Tinker, Tailor, Soldier, Spy, attends Roedean on a scholarship.
 The School is mentioned in the episode of the hit British comedy Only Fools and Horses called The Russians Are Coming.

See also
Grade II listed buildings in Brighton and Hove: P–R

References

External links

St Mary's Hall Association Website
Profile on the ISC website
ISI Inspection Reports

Boarding schools in East Sussex
Girls' schools in East Sussex
Educational institutions established in 1885
Private schools in Brighton and Hove
Member schools of the Girls' Schools Association
Grade II listed buildings in Brighton and Hove
1885 establishments in England
Schools with a royal charter